Ernst Kaltenbrunner (5 July 1937 – 11 July 1967) was an Austrian footballer. He played in one match for the Austria national football team in 1960.

References

External links
 

1937 births
1967 deaths
Austrian footballers
Austria international footballers
Place of birth missing
Association footballers not categorized by position